Richard Burn (1709 – 12 November 1785) was an English legal writer.

Education and career
Burn was born in Winton, Kirkby Stephen, Westmorland.  He matriculated at The Queen's College, Oxford in 1729. He was not awarded his B.A. until 1735, three years after he left the university to accept a position as schoolmaster at Kirkby Stephen in Westmorland. Burn then entered the Church of England, and in 1736 became vicar of Orton in Westmorland. He was a justice of the peace for the counties of Westmorland and Cumberland, and devoted himself to the study of law. In 1762, after Burn had attained notoriety as a legal scholar, the University of Oxford awarded him an honorary LL.D. He was appointed chancellor of the diocese of Carlisle in 1765, an office which he held until his death.  He died, aged 86, in Orton.

Writings
Burn's Justice of the Peace and Parish Officer, first published in 1755, was for many years the standard authority on the law relating to justices of the peace. It has passed through some 30 editions, half of which appeared after Burn's death. His Ecclesiastical Law (1760), a work of much research, was the foundation upon which were built many modern commentaries on ecclesiastical law.

Burn's other publications include: Digest of the Militia Laws (1760), History of the Poor Laws: with observations (1764), and A New Law Dictionary (2 vols., 1792). The last-named work, published after the author's death by his son, was an update of William Blackstone's Commentaries on the Laws of England.

Burn was a noted antiquarian. He collaborated with Joseph Nicolson to compile The History and Antiquities of the Counties of Westmorland and Cumberland, published in 1777. The two-volume work relates information concerning the families, customs, architecture, and political and religious history of the two counties, and continues to be of great interest to family and local historians.

Personal life
Burn married first in 1736 Eleanor Nelson (died 1739) and second in 1740 Anne Kitchen. He and his wife Anne had one son, John, born in 1744.

Notes

References

B. C. Jones, "Introduction," in Joseph Nicolson and Richard Burn, The History and Antiquities of the Counties of Westmorland and Cumberland (West Yorkshire, England: EP Publishing, 1976), xiv-xxiii.

External links 

English legal writers
English antiquarians
1709 births
1785 deaths
People from Kirkby Stephen
Legal historians